The Book of Stars is a 1999 American drama film directed by Michael Miner and starring Mary Stuart Masterson and Jena Malone as two sisters, both of whom are on the down slopes of their lives but in entirely different ways. It received its world premiere as part of the 1999 South By Southwest Film Festival.

Plot
Penny and Mary are sisters living together in a tenement apartment in a seedy section of an unnamed city. The responsibility of caring for fifteen-year-old Mary has fallen on Penny due to the death of their parents years before.

Mary has cystic fibrosis, and the deterioration of her lungs is rapidly worsening. Forced to spend most of her time indoors, she has tracked her life and dreams and hopes in an artistic scrapbook which she calls her "Book of Stars and Lovely Things." In it, she fashions herself an astronaut, cut adrift in space and slowly and helplessly drifting towards the sun and her eventual doom. Penny is a once-promising poet who has turned to a life of prostitution and drugs to help numb her from the grim reality of her job and the impending loss of her sister.

There is a quiet young man who has moved in next door. He is from war-torn Eastern Europe and walks with a limp. Penny gets a letter from a prisoner, who was moved by her poetry and writes her admiring letters. She won't answer, or even read the letters, so Mary does it for her.

Mary arranges things and events to keep her sister human. Together, they all face life, death, and the universal need to reach out for someone.

Cast

Soundtrack
The soundtrack was released on August 23, 2005 on La-La Land Records.

Track listing
"Main Title" – 3:03
"The Meeting / Refuge" – 2:23
"The Prisoner's First Letter / Mary's Dream" – 3:18
"Painted Lady / Mary's World / The Fight" – 3:32
"New Friend" – 1:40
"Storm Warnings" – 4:35
"Tellmeaboutthebeach / Ticklefight / Solar Plunge" – 4:04
"Picnic" – 2:41
"Overdose / Grim Reaper / The Hospital" – 4:51
"Torn Letter" – 4:56
"Happy Birthday" – 1:57
"Samuel's Story" – 2:51
"The Book is Finished / Afterlife / The Beach" – 5:44
"Transcendence" – 3:42
"End Credits" – 4:52
"Alternate End Credits" – 5:40

Awards

References

External links

The Book of Stars review by Gordon Kearns

1999 films
1999 drama films
1999 independent films
1990s coming-of-age drama films
American coming-of-age drama films
American independent films
Films about cystic fibrosis
Films about sisters
Films scored by Richard Gibbs
Films shot in Washington (state)
1990s English-language films
1990s American films